Jo Williams (born 1 December 1981) is a British short track speed skater. She competed at the 2002 Winter Olympics and the 2006 Winter Olympics.

References

External links
 

1981 births
Living people
British female short track speed skaters
Olympic short track speed skaters of Great Britain
Short track speed skaters at the 2002 Winter Olympics
Short track speed skaters at the 2006 Winter Olympics
People from Isleworth